Neophrynichthys is a small genus of marine ray-finned fishes belonging to the family Psychrolutidae, the fatheads. These fishes are found in the southwestern Pacific Ocean waters around New Zealand.

Species
There are currently two recognized species in this genus:
 Neophrynichthys heterospilos K. L. Jackson & J. S. Nelson, 2000
 Neophrynichthys latus (F. W. Hutton, 1875) (Dark toadfish)

References

Psychrolutidae
Marine fish of New Zealand
Marine fish genera
Taxa named by Albert Günther